Woman's Day is an Australian women's magazine published by Are Media. It is Australia's highest selling weekly magazine.

History and profile
On August 16, 1948 Australian women got a new voice when (The Australian) Woman's Day rolled off the presses - promising a progressive mix of celebrity stories, fashion trends, creative cooking, Sage advice, fabulous fiction, medical tips and current events.
The first cover was artwork featuring a child offering up a pink hyacinth snipped from her mother's favourite pot plant, sending a playful message to readers to "come and join the fun".

Originally printed and published by Joseph Swanson Wilkinson of Toorak, Victoria for Cologravure Publications
(The Herald & Weekly Times Limited).
Subsequently the magazine became part of ACP Magazines, which in turn was owned by Nine Entertainment Co which owns Australian television network Nine Network. Because of this, Woman's Day often featured many stories either based on or in partnership with a Nine Network program, such as A Current Affair. The magazine became part of Bauer Media Group in 2012, after Nine Entertainment Co got into financial difficulties. It is published weekly by Bauer Media Pty Ltd and is headquartered in Sydney.

Aimed at women aged 25 to 54, it continued to feature news but more recently gossip and interviews about Australian and international celebrities, as well as some lifestyle and recipes.

Sales figures, readership and advertising revenue have fallen significantly in recent years, down from 405,000 weekly sales in 2010 to 330,000 in March 2014. Readership fell another 14.6% in the year ended 2014.

In early April 2020, Bauer Media Australia announced that it would be closing Woman's Day as well as several Australian and New Zealand brands including The Australian Women's Weekly and New Zealand Woman's Weekly in response to the economic downturn caused by the COVID-19 pandemic in Australia and New Zealand.

On 17 June 2020, Australian investment company Mercury Capital acquired Woman's Day as part of its purchase of Bauer Media's Australian and New Zealand assets. On 17 July, Mercury Capital announced that it would be publishing Woman's Day and several other Australian and New Zealand titles.

In late September 2020, Mercury Capital rebranded Bauer Media as Are Media, which took over publication of Woman's Day.

Controversies
In 2007, the magazine settled out of court with New Zealand television presenter Charlotte Dawson, who had sued the magazine over its coverage of her divorce.

The magazine underwent significant layoffs in 2008.

In November 2013, Woman's Day came under fire from its readers after a story featuring Kate Middleton, the Duchess of Cambridge, took issue with her appearance by comparing a photo of her before having her baby and after with the headline 'What's happened to Kate?' Criticism suggested that women who have just had a baby often look tired, and she was not wearing makeup in the second image like she was in the first.

In 2014, television presenter Grant Denyer began legal precedings against the magazine after it claimed he and his wife were in a rehab facility in Thailand for methamphetamine addiction. Denyer claimed they had visited a rehab facility, but it was not for drug issues, and reaffirmed they did not have a drug addiction. The magazine backed the story saying Denyer's friends were their sources for the story.

Woman's Day was criticised on the Australian Broadcasting Corporation's Media Watch, in which it was described as "garbage journalism" for the use of sensationalist headlines and content.

References

External links
Woman's Day

1953 establishments in Australia
ACP magazine titles
Are Media
Weekly magazines published in Australia
Women's magazines published in Australia
Celebrity magazines
Magazines established in 1953
Magazines published in Sydney